Md Sayeed Salam is a Bangladeshi academic. He was the vice-chancellor of State University of Bangladesh.

Education
Salam completed his bachelor's degree in electrical and electronic engineering in 1984 from Bangladesh University of Engineering and Technology. He later earned his master's degree and Ph.D. in computer science from the National University of Malaysia in 1990 and 1995 respectively.

References

Living people
Vice-Chancellors of universities in Bangladesh
Bangladesh University of Engineering and Technology alumni
National University of Malaysia alumni
Year of birth missing (living people)